The size of a book is generally measured by the height against the width of a leaf, or sometimes the height and width of its cover. A series of terms is commonly used by libraries and publishers for the general sizes of modern books, ranging from folio (the largest), to quarto (smaller) and octavo (still smaller). Historically, these terms referred to the format of the book, a technical term used by printers and bibliographers to indicate the size of a leaf in terms of the size of the original sheet. For example, a quarto (from Latin quartō, ablative form of quartus, fourth) historically was a book printed on sheets of paper folded in half twice, with the first fold at right angles to the second, to produce 4 leaves (or 8 pages), each leaf one fourth the size of the original sheet printed – note that a leaf refers to the single piece of paper, whereas a page is one side of a leaf. Because the actual format of many modern books cannot be determined from examination of the books, bibliographers may not use these terms in scholarly descriptions.

Book formats
In the hand press period (up to about 1820) books were manufactured by printing text on both sides of a full sheet of paper and then folding the paper one or more times into a group of leaves or gathering. The binder would sew the gatherings (sometimes also called signatures) through their inner hinges and attached to cords in the spine to form the book block. Before the covers were bound to the book, the block of text pages was sometimes trimmed along the three unbound edges to open the folds of the paper and to produce smooth edges for the book. When the leaves were not trimmed, the reader would have to cut open the leaf edges using a knife.

Books made by printing two pages of text on each side of a sheet of paper, which is then folded once to form two leaves or four pages, are referred to as folios (from Latin, foliō, ablative of folium, leaf). Those made by printing four text pages on each side of a sheet of paper and folding the paper twice to form a gathering containing four leaves or eight pages are called quartos (fourths). Similarly, books made by printing eight pages of text on each side of a sheet, which was then folded three times to form gatherings of eight leaves or sixteen pages each, are called octavos. The size of the resulting pages in these cases depends, of course, on the size of the full sheet used to print them and how much the leaves were trimmed before binding, but where the same size paper is used, folios are the largest, followed by quartos and then octavos. The proportion of leaves of quartos tends to be squarer than that of folios or octavos.

These various production methods are referred to as the format of the book. These terms are often abbreviated, using 4to for quarto, 8vo for octavo, and so on. The octavo format, with eight leaves per gathering, has half the page size of the quarto format before trimming. Smaller formats include the duodecimo (12mo or twelvemo), with twelve leaves per sheet and pages one-third the size of the quarto format, and the sextodecimo (16mo or sixteenmo), with sixteen leaves per sheet, half the size of the octavo format and one quarter the size of the quarto. The vast majority of books were printed in the folio, quarto, octavo or duodecimo formats.

There are many variations in how such books were produced. For example, folios were rarely made by simply binding up a group of two leaf gatherings; instead several printed leaf pairs would be inserted within another, to produce a larger gathering of multiple leaves that would be more convenient for binding. For example, three two-leaf printed sheets might be inserted in a fourth, producing gatherings of eight leaves or sixteen pages each. Bibliographers still refer to such books as folios (and not octavos) because the original full sheets were folded once to produce two leaves, and describe such gatherings as folios in 8s. Similarly, a book printed as an octavo, but bound with gatherings of four leaves each, is called an octavo in 4s.

In determining the format of a book, bibliographers will study the number of leaves in a gathering, their proportion and sizes and also the arrangement of the chain lines and watermarks in the paper.

In order for the pages to come out in the correct order, the printers would have to properly lay out the pages of type in the printing press. For example, to print two leaves in folio containing pages 1 through 4, the printer would print pages 1 and 4 on one side of the sheet and, after that has dried, print pages 2 and 3 on the other side. If a printer was printing a folio in 8s, as described above, he would have to print pages 1 and 16 on one side of a leaf with pages 2 and 15 on the other side of that leaf, etc. The arrangement of the pages of type in the press is referred to as the imposition and there are a number of methods of imposing pages for the various formats, some of which involve cutting the printed pages before binding.
See Further reading for more on imposition schemes.

Modern book production
As printing and paper technology developed, it became possible to produce and to print on much larger sheets or rolls of paper and it may not be apparent (or even possible to determine) from examination of a modern book how the paper was folded to produce them. For example, a modern novel may consist of gatherings of sixteen leaves, but may actually have been printed with sixty-four pages on each side of a very large sheet of paper. Similarly, the actual printing format cannot be determined for books that are perfect bound, where every leaf in the book is completely cut out (i.e., not conjugate to another leaf as in gatherings) and is glued into the spine. Modern books are commonly called folio, quarto and octavo based simply on their size rather than the format in which they were actually produced, if that can even be determined. Scholarly bibliographers may describe such books based on the number of leaves in each gathering (eight leaves per gathering forming an octavo), even where the actual number of pages printed on the original sheet is unknown or may reject the use of these terms for modern books entirely.

Today, octavo and quarto are the most common book sizes, but many books are produced in larger and smaller sizes as well.

Records

Largest book

According to the 2003 Guinness World Records, the largest book in the world was Bhutan: A Visual Odyssey Across the Last Himalayan Kingdom by Michael Hawley.

According to the 2007 Guinness World Records, the largest published book in the world was The Little Prince printed in Brazil in 2007.

According to the 2012 Guinness World Records, the largest book in the world was This the Prophet Mohamed made in Dubai, UAE. Though larger than The Little Prince, the two hold separate records, as This the Prophet Mohamed was not published.

Smallest book
The smallest book is Teeny Ted from Turnip Town measured .

Largest manuscript
The largest surviving medieval manuscript is the Codex Gigas or 'Devil's Manuscript', measured at 92 cm tall by 50 cm wide (36 inches tall by 20 inches wide).

Paper sizes

During the hand press period, full sheets of printing paper were manufactured in a great variety of sizes which were given a number of names, such as pot, demy, foolscap, crown, etc. These were not standardized and the actual sizes varied across countries and times.

The size and proportions of a book depend on the size of the original full sheet. An octavo page, oriented a quarter turn from the full sheet, would have height ½ × 19 =  and width ¼ × 25 = . The sizes of books of the same format will differ in proportion to the full sheets used to print them.

Common formats and sizes

United States
The following table is adapted from the scale of the American Library Association,
The words before octavo signify the traditional names for unfolded paper sheet sizes. Other dimensions may exist as well. US Trade size corresponds with octavo and is popular for hardbacks. Mass market paperback corresponds with duodecimo.

United Kingdom
A common paperback size in the UK is B-format, which is used, for example, by Penguin Classics. This contrasts with A-format, which is slightly narrower than ISO B6, and C-format.

Formerly the descriptions octavo, quarto, duodecimo, etc. were used (see table under United States above).

Japan
In book construction, Japan uses a mixture of ISO A-series, JIS B-series, and several traditional Japanese paper sizes. A- and B-series signatures are folded from a sheet slightly larger than ISO A1 and JIS B1, respectively, then trimmed to size. The most commonly encountered sizes are listed below.

See also
List of booksellers' abbreviations
Units of paper quantity

Notes

References

Further reading
A number of imposition schemes for different formats may be found in:

Gaskell (1972), pages 88–107

Additional tables and discussion of American book formats and sizes may be found in:

Roberts (1982), available online

Book design
Books by type
Printing